The first season of the American version of the television reality program Love Island began airing on July 9, 2019, and concluded on August 7, 2019. The 22-episode series was broadcast on CBS in the United States and CTV in Canada. Arielle Vandenberg hosted the series while Matthew Hoffman provided voice-over narration. On August 7, 2019, having received the largest quantity of votes from the public, Zac Mirabelli and Elizabeth Weber were crowned the winners and split the  prize. Dylan Curry and Alexandra Stewart were named the runners-up.

The show's first season generally received mixed reviews from critics and its ratings were not as high as CBS's expectations. The series was renewed for a second season before the first had finished airing.

Format

Love Island is a reality television program in which a group of contestants, who are referred to as "Islanders", are living in a villa in Fiji. The Islanders are cut off from the outside world and are under constant video surveillance. To survive in the villa, the Islanders must be in a relationship with another Islander. The Islanders couple up for the first time on first impressions but they are later forced to "re-couple" at special ceremonies in which they can choose to remain with their current partners or to switch partners. At the villa, the couples must share a bed for sleeping and are permitted to talk with other Islanders at any time, allowing them to get to know everyone. While in the villa, each Islander has his or her own telephone, with which they can contact other Islanders via text and can receive text messages informing them of the latest challenges, dumpings, and re-couplings. While the Islanders might appear to have unmediated access to the outside world, they are limited in both their alcohol consumption and communication with the outside world. 

The Islanders are presented with many games and challenges that are designed to test their physical and mental abilities, after which the winners are sometimes presented with special prizes, such as a night at the Hideaway or a special date.

Islanders can be eliminated, or "dumped", for several reasons; these include remaining single after a re-coupling and by public vote through the Love Island mobile app. During the show's final week, members of the public vote to decide which couple should win the series; the couple who receive the most votes win.

At the envelope ceremony on finale night, the couple who received the highest number of votes from the public receive two envelopes, one for each partner. One envelope contains  and the other contains nothing. The partner with the  envelope may choose whether to share the money with his or her partner as a test of trust and commitment.

Islanders

On June 30, 2019, the initial Islanders were revealed. These Islanders entered the villa on July 7. All of the other Islanders were revealed as the series progressed. At the envelope ceremony, Elizabeth drew the envelope containing the $100,000 and decided to split the money with her partner, Zac.

Future appearances
Kyra Green appeared on the new MTV dating series Match Me If You Can in 2021. Ray Gantt & Caro Viehweg competed as a team on The Amazing Race 33, prior to the suspension due to the COVID-19 pandemic and they did not return for the resumption of that season. Cormac Murphy briefly appeared on the 10th series of Celebs Go Dating. Gantt, Viehweg and Green appeared on the fifth season of MTV's Ex on the Beach along with Emily Salch. In 2022, Green competed on The Challenge: USA along with Cashel Barnett.

Episodes

Production

Development
On February 22, 2006, it was announced an American version of Celebrity Love Island was in development at My Network TV but the program was never produced. On August 8, 2018, it was reported CBS had acquired from ITV Studios and Motion Content Group the rights to produce an American non-celebrity version of the show with David George, Adam Sher, and David Eilenberg serving as executive producers. Simon Thomas, Mandy Morris, Ben Thursby, Richard Foster, and Chet Fenster later joined the series as executive producers in addition to the original three. It was also announced Arielle Vandenberg would be hosting the series. Matthew Hoffman was selected as the narrator for the series; his narrative style involved leveling sarcastic comments at the contestants in voice-overs. CBS budgeted $30 million to produce the season.

On August 1, 2019, CBS renewed the series for a second season.

Filming
Filming started on July 7, 2019, two days before the Islanders entered the villa. Filming took 32 days and ended on August 7 during the live-to-tape finale. Rather than using a villa on the Spanish Balearic island of Mallorca as the UK series does, the American Love Island is filmed in a custom-built villa on an island in Fiji. Series producers chose Fiji as a location because "it 'meant something to Americans' and 'feels like a place you would want to come and fall in love'."

Villa

The villa features a two-story house in which the Islanders live; it has a communal bedroom and an outdoor kitchen downstairs. The outdoor area has a pool, hot tub, gymnasium, outdoor bar, shower, and lounge areas, and also a fire pit where most re-couplings take place. There are seven queen-sized beds in the communal bedroom, which the couples share throughout the season. The second floor of the villa has a bathroom containing an infinity bathtub, dressing area, balcony, and a toilet, which the Islanders shared. Also upstairs is a room with four vanities and a balcony where the women could get ready. Areas of the villa, including its garden, collectively contain 3,000 locally sourced plants. Over a mile of neon lights are strung around parts of the villa.

The Hideaway, designed by Jonathan Adler, is a secluded bedroom and outdoor area. Couples could earn the privilege of spending a night at the Hideaway by winning one of the games that are regularly played in the villa during the season.

Broadcast
The series opened with a 90-minute premiere on July 9, 2019. From July 9 to August 7, 2019, 22 episodes were aired, each lasting around 60 minutes. The series was simulcast on CTV in Canada. On Saturday, July 27, 2019, American television channel Pop broadcast a 14-hour marathon of the first fourteen episodes of the series.

Prize
As part of the Love Island format, after the winning couple was announced, they were presented with two envelopes, one of which contained the  prize; the other envelope contained nothing. They both chose an envelope and announced what was inside. The Islander who chose the envelope containing the prize money decided whether to share the money with the partner or take it all.

Reunion
On October 17, 2019, starting at 7 p.m. Pacific Daylight Time, the contestants of the first series of Love Island, including host Arielle Vandenberg and narrator Matthew Hoffman, attended a reunion party. The reunion would have been the first time the entire cast of the series was together but Mallory Santic, Cormac Murphy, Marli Tyndall, Winston Hines, Kelsey Jurewicz, and Anton Morrow did not attend. Viewers could ask questions of the cast through social media.

Coupling and elimination history

Notes

Reception

Critical response
Review aggregator website Rotten Tomatoes gives the first American series of Love Island 50%, holding an average rating of 5.25 out of 10 with the consensus being "Crude, rude, but without that charming British attitude, Love Island fails to make a splash across the pond—though fans may still find comfort in its cynically familiar formula". Metacritic, which uses a weighted average, gives the series a metascore of 56 indicating "mixed or average reviews". After watching the pilot, Yohana Desta of Vanity Fair said the series "was a charmer in its first episode" but noted the differences between host Arielle Vandenberg and narrator Matthew Hoffman from their British counterparts Caroline Flack and Iain Stirling, respectively, stating Vanderberg is much more of a joker than Flack and that Hoffman had not captured the "snarky energy" of Stirling. Eric Thurm of The A.V. Club called the series "pure chaotic evil" and said, "Love Island is about a bunch of hot people sitting by a pool bonding over the fact that they have nothing to do". Thurm also said the pacing is too quick, with Islanders doing nothing and everything in the same episode. Reviewing the first five episodes, Kathryn VanArendonk of Vulture stated "Love Island is boring, but hard to escape", but Ben Travers of IndieWire opined that the contestants were bland.

Viewing figures
CBS Entertainment president Kelly Kahl told The Hollywood Reporter it was targeting a young, mostly female audience for the series. It also said the average Love Island viewer is eight years younger than CBS' wider average audience. Kahl also said there was a large, social-media-based engagement with the series, noting it has created a large amount of enthusiasm at the network. Despite regularly having generally poor viewing figures, CBS revealed Love Island was the most-streamed show on CBS All Access during the summer television schedule, outpacing other summer series Big Brother as well as other popular CBS series including Survivor and The Big Bang Theory. On August 29, 2019, Love Island averaged a 3.7% share in the 18-49 demographic and 2.7 million viewers per episode.

Despite the first season receiving mixed reviews from critics and less-than-ideal viewing figures, the series was renewed for a second season.

References

2019 American television seasons
Television shows filmed in Fiji